7.5 on the Richter Scale is an album by American jazz musician Stan Kenton and his Orchestra that was released in 1973. Recording sessions for the album took place during August 1973 in Hollywood, California.

Background
Until 7.5 on the Richter Scale the band had primarily made swing recordings with progressive leanings. The 1969 Capitol release of Stan Kenton: The Music of Hair was the only other time since 1943 that Kenton moved away from his style. He had no involvement in the Hair album except for his name appearing on the jacket cover. Ralph Carmichael and Lennie Niehaus were in charge. Producer Lee Gillette at Capitol was trying to take advantage of the popularity of the musical. Due to lack of promotion, the album was a commercial failure, and this was Kenton's last album for Capitol.

In 1970 Kenton moved to his label, Creative World Records, when the music industry was changing. He turned to arrangers Hank Levy and Bob Curnow to write material that appealed to a younger audience. The first albums released by Creative World were concerts by Kenton. He controlled the content, but he lacked the resources to engineer and produce what Capitol had paid for in the past. He gambled that he could rely on direct mail to jazz fans to sell albums. During 1973 Kenton wanted to change the band drastically. He told Gene Roland to come up with a rock-oriented album that would retain the Kenton sound. By June 1973 Curnow had become artists and repertoire manager overseeing Creative World, and he produced the album. Much of the music Roland produced fell short of his previous work. Other writers were called for help.

"We (did) 7.5 On the Richter Scale with some pretty wild things on there, including my chart of Paul McCartney's "Live and Let Die".

Track listing

Personnel
 Stan Kenton – piano
 Paul Adamson – trumpet
 Mike Barrowman – trumpet
 Dennis Noday – trumpet
 Gary Pack – trumpet
 Jay Saunders – trumpet
 Mike Snustead – trumpet
 Dale Devoe – trombone
 Bill Hartman – trombone
 Dick Shearer – trombone
 Lloyd Spoon – trombone
 Mike Wallace – trombone, tuba
 Mary Fettig – saxophone
 John Park – saxophone
 Kim Park – saxophone
 Roy Reynolds – saxophone
 Richard Torres – saxophone
 Kerby Stewart – double bass, bass guitar
 Peter Erskine – drums
 Ramon Lopez – percussion

References

External links
 Review at AllMusic

1973 albums
Stan Kenton albums
Instrumental albums
GNP Crescendo Records albums
Albums produced by Bob Curnow